Barry T. Albin (born July 7, 1952) is an American lawyer and former judge from New Jersey. He served as an associate justice of the New Jersey Supreme Court from 2002 to 2022. A Democrat, Albin is noted for his jurisprudence in New Jersey's criminal law, in which his opinions would frequently favor the due-process rights of criminal defendants. He stepped down from the court July 6, 2022, a day prior to turning 70, New Jersey's mandatory retirement age for judges. The final opinion he wrote involved how municipalities may fill vacated seats.

Biography
Albin was born on July 7, 1952, in Brooklyn, to Gerald, a pressman for The New York Times, and Norma Albin. He grew up in Bayside, Queens, New York, and Sayreville, New Jersey, where he graduated from Sayreville War Memorial High School in 1970. He graduated from Rutgers University in 1973 and Cornell Law School in 1976. After graduation, he started a career as a Deputy Attorney General in the Appellate Section of the New Jersey Division of Criminal Justice. After this career, he became Assistant Prosecutor in Passaic and Middlesex counties, which he held from 1978 to 1982. He then joined the firm of Wilentz, Goldman & Spitzer P.A., becoming partner in 1986.

Albin served as a member of the New Jersey Supreme Court Criminal Practice Committee from 1987 until 1992, and gained the honor of being selected by peers to have his name included in the "Best Lawyers in America" (2000–2001). He became the president of the New Jersey Association of Criminal Defense Lawyers, a position he held from 1999–2000.

Albin was nominated by Governor James E. McGreevey on July 10, 2002, as a justice in the New Jersey Supreme Court. He was confirmed on September 12 of the same year and was sworn in on September 18, 2002.

On May 15, 2009, Governor Jon Corzine renominated Albin, whose initial seven-year term would have expired on September 18, 2009. Albin's re-appointment was cleared by the Senate on June 26, 2009.

Following his mandatory retirement from the court, Albin became a partner at Lowenstein Sandler, joining the litigation department and chairing the firm’s appellate practice group. 

Barry Albin and his wife, Inna Albin, have two sons, Gerald and Daniel.

Decisions

2008-09 Term
Lourdes Medical Center v. Bd. of Review
Mazzacano v. Happy Hour Social & Athletic Club of Maple Shade, Inc.
M.S. v. Millburn Police Dept.
State v. Byrd; State v. Dean - Adopted forfeiture-by-wrongdoing doctrine
State v. Grenci
State v. Nyhammer

2007-08 Term
DYFS v. E.P.
Jamgochian v. N.J. State Parole Bd.
Senna v. Florimont
Sensient Colors, Inc. v. Allstate Ins. Co.
State in the Interest of J.A.
State v. Cottle
State v. Garcia
State v. Gelman
State v. Johnson
State v. O'Neill
State v. Rodriguez
Utley v. Board of Review, Department of Labor

2006-07 Term
Acuna v. Turkish
In re Referendum Petition to Repeal Ord. 04-75
Johnson v. Scaccetti
Lewis v. Harris
Malinowski v. Jacobs - companion case to Simon
R.A.C. v. P.J.S., Jr.
Simon v. Cronecker
Simon v. Rando - Companion case to Simon
State v. Blakney
State v. Elders
State v. Fortin (Fortin II)
State v. Loftin
State v. Meyer
State v. Williams
Thompson v. City of Atlantic City

2005-06 Term
DYFS v. S.S. in the Matter of the Guardianship of A.M.S.
IMO Freshwater Wetlands Statewide General Permits
In re Verified Petition of Michael G. Venezia
Pasqua v. Council
Prado v. State
State v. Badessa
State v. Crawley
State v. Delgado
State v. Denofa
State v. Domicz
State v. Morrison
Williams v. State

2004-05 Term
Brunswick Hills Racquet Club, Inc. v. Rt. 18 Shopping Ctr. Ascts., Ltd.
DiProspero v. Penn
French v. Hernandez
Furst v. Einstein Moomjy
Gonzalez v. Safe and Sound Sec. Corp.
IMO E. Lorraine Harris
IMO Grand Jury Appearance Request by Larry Loigman, Esq.
Jerista v. Murray
Loigman v. Twp. Cmte. of Middletown
Serrano v. Serrano - Companion case to DiProspero
State v. Abdullah - Companion case to Natale
State v. Branch
State v. Feaster
State v. Franklin - Companion case to Natale
State v. Jenkins
State v. Natale
State v. Muhammad

2003-04 Term
Brodsky v. Grinnell Haulers, Inc.
Caviglia v. Royal Tours of Am.
Ferreira v. Rancocas Orthopedia Ascts.
Glukowsky v. Equity One, Inc.
IMO Individual Health Coverage Program
IMO Philip L. Kantor
IMO Stephen A. Gallo
Knorr v. Smeal - Companion case to Ferreira
Morton v. 4 Orchard Land Trust
State v. Frankel
State v. Garron
State v. Guenther
State v. Kashi
State v. Spivey
State v. Ways
Scully v. Fitzgerald
University of Massachusetts Memorial Med. Ctr., Inc. v. Christodoulou
Vastano v. Algeier

2002-03 Term
Frugis v. Bracigliano
IMO Expungement Application of P.A.F.
Parks v. Rogers
State v. Evers
State v. Fortin (Fortin I)
State v. Franklin
State v. Jimenez

References

External links

Justice Barry T. Albin

1952 births
Living people
20th-century American lawyers
21st-century American judges
21st-century American lawyers
Cornell Law School alumni
Justices of the Supreme Court of New Jersey
New Jersey Democrats
New Jersey lawyers
People from Sayreville, New Jersey
Rutgers University alumni
Sayreville War Memorial High School alumni